John Paul Sullivan (November 2, 1920 – September 20, 2007) was an American professional baseball shortstop who played in Major League Baseball (MLB) for the Washington Senators and St. Louis Browns. Sullivan was the Senators' starting shortstop from 1942 until 1944, when his career was interrupted by World War II. Upon his return in 1947, he was mainly used as a reserve. Sullivan was a lifelong resident of Homewood.

References

External links

Major League Baseball shortstops
Washington Senators (1901–1960) players
St. Louis Browns players
Thomasville Lookouts players
Chattanooga Lookouts players
San Antonio Missions players
Toronto Maple Leafs (International League) players
Lynchburg Cardinals players
Wisconsin Badgers baseball players
Baseball players from Illinois
1920 births
2007 deaths
People from Homewood, Illinois